The Grange , Ramsgate, Kent, on the coast of southern England was designed by the Victorian architect and designer Augustus Pugin for himself. Built between 1843 and 1844, in the Gothic Revival style, Pugin intended it both as a home and as a manifesto for his architectural philosophy. Rescued from demolition by the Landmark Trust in 1997, the Grange is a Grade I listed building.

History
Pugin bought the land for the site at West Cliff, Ramsgate, in 1841. The house was built between 1843 and 1844 by the builder George Myers. Pugin's second wife died in 1844 and it was only after his third marriage to Jane Knill in 1848 that it became a family home. The interior of the house was finally completed in 1850. It is built from the inside out in the sense that the layout of the rooms was considered before the outside of the building. This is in contrast to the Georgian style that preceded it. The style was influential on subsequent English architecture designed by architects like Edwin Lutyens.

Pugin died in the house in 1852 at the age of only 40. He is buried in the impressive Pugin chantry chapel in St Augustine's Church, next to the house, which was also designed by him and completed by his eldest son, Edward Pugin, who was also an architect.

The house was rescued from demolition by the Landmark Trust in 1997 and restored by them to its condition in Pugin's day with grants from the Heritage Lottery Fund, English Heritage, Thanet District Council and elsewhere. It was re-opened in 2006 for up to eight temporary residents at a time and visitors by appointment on Wednesdays. In October 2010, The Grange was awarded the Restoration of the Century award (South region) by Country Life magazine.  A Time Team special documents the work done and biographs Augustus Pugin's life.

Architecture and description
The Grange is a Grade I listed building.

See also 
 Historic buildings in Ramsgate

References

Sources

External links
 Landmark Trust information
 Thanet website

Country houses in Kent
Grade I listed houses in Kent
Augustus Pugin buildings
Ramsgate
Houses completed in 1844
Landmark Trust properties in England